"Staying Together" is the fifth single from American singer-songwriter-actress Debbie Gibson, and the fourth released in support of her album Out of the Blue.  However, it did not perform as well as any of the previous singles, stalling at No. 22 on the Billboard Hot 100. The single reached No. 53 in the UK in 1988. Written by Gibson and originally co-produced and co-arranged with Fred Zarr, this track was edited and co-produced for the single by then-BiZarr Music engineer-understudy Phil Castellano.

Cash Box said that Gibson "rocks out using a pulsating, throbbing base line under a bubble-pop, yet catchy tune."

Track listing

Remixes
Staying Together [LP Version] 4:07
Staying Together [Video Version] 4:23
Staying Together [Bonus Beats] 1:31
Staying Together [Dub Version] 5:56
Staying Together [LP Version With Vocal Re-Cut] 4:15
Staying Together [Club Mix] 5:57

Weekly charts

References

External links
 

1988 singles
1988 songs
2005 singles
Debbie Gibson songs
Song recordings produced by Fred Zarr
Songs written by Debbie Gibson
Atlantic Records singles